Timothy Keller may refer to:

 Tim Keller (pastor) (born 1950), American Christian pastor, author and speaker 
 Tim Keller (politician) (born 1977), American politician and mayor of Albuquerque

See also
Keller (surname)